Bertram B. B. Mapunda (born 26 September 1957) is an archaeometallurgist and professor of anthropology and history at Jordan University College, Tanzania, since October 2017. He is also principal of the college. He discovered the short, convectional iron smelting furnaces of south-western Tanzania.

Early life and education
Bertram Mapunda was born on 26 September 1957 in Lituhi, Ruvuma, Tanzania, to Baltasar and Marciana (Mahundi) Mapunda. He married Victoria Martin in 1992. They have two children.

He received his BA from the University of Dar es Salaam, Tanzania, in 1989, and his MA and PhD from  the University of Florida in 1991 and 1995 respectively.

Career
Mapunda is an archaeometallurgist and professor of anthropology and history at Jordan University College, Tanzania, since October 2017. He is also principal of the college. He was previously at the University of Dar es Salaam. He is credited with the discovery of the short, convectional iron smelting furnaces of south-western Tanzania.

Selected publications

 Salvaging Tanzania's Cultural Heritage. Dar es Salaam University Press, Dar es Salaam, 2005. (With Paul Msemwa) 
 Dar es Salaam's Top Twenty Tourist Attractions. Bertram Mapunda, Dar es Salaam, 2010.

References

External links 
https://www.researchgate.net/profile/Bertram_Mapunda
https://www.youtube.com/watch?v=A2HmqyvNNKg

Living people
1957 births
University of Dar es Salaam alumni
Academic staff of the University of Dar es Salaam
University of Florida alumni
Archaeometallurgists
Archaeologists of Africa
Tanzanian archaeologists
Academic staff of St. Augustine University of Tanzania